Van Slyke or Van Slycke is a Dutch toponymic surname meaning "of/from Slyke". The Dictionary of American Family Names published by Oxford University Press documents the two most likely meanings of the word "Slyke" here:

 from Middle Dutch slijcke "mire", "marshy place" (modern Dutch slijk)
 from a place named after this word, such as Slijkenburg in Friesland, Slijkewijck in Gelderland or possibly Slik in North Holland

People with the surname Van Slyke
Andy Van Slyke (born 1960), American baseball player
Donald Van Slyke (1883–1971), Dutch American chemist
Lucille Baldwin Van Slyke (1879–1966), American writer
Rik Van Slycke (born 1963), former Belgian cyclist
Scott Van Slyke (born 1986), American baseball player. son of Andy Van Slyke
Steven Van Slyke, American chemist

See also
Van Slyke determination, chemical test

References

Dutch-language surnames
Surnames of Dutch origin